Camp O-AT-KA is a non-profit summer camp for boys in East Sebago, Maine. Founded in 1906 by Rev. Ernest Joseph Dennen of Lynn, Massachusetts, it was the summer camp of the Order of Sir Galahad. The Order of Sir Galahad was an organization for Anglican and Episcopal boys and men which was also founded by Dennen. It may have also accepted a small number of Jewish boys. It is a traditional summer camp for boys aged 7-16 located on the western shore of Sebago Lake.

References

External links
 Official site

Summer camps in Maine
1906 establishments in Maine